"Whiskey in the Jar" (Roud 533) is an Irish traditional song set in the southern mountains of Ireland, often with specific mention of counties Cork and Kerry. The song, about a rapparee (highwayman) who is betrayed by his wife or lover, is one of the most widely performed traditional Irish songs and has been recorded by numerous artists since the 1950s.

The song first gained wide exposure when Irish folk band The Dubliners performed it internationally as a signature song, and recorded it on three albums in the 1960s. In the U.S., the song was popularised by The Highwaymen, who recorded it on their 1962 album Encore. Irish rock band Thin Lizzy hit the Irish and British pop charts with the song in 1973. In 1990, The Dubliners re-recorded the song with The Pogues with a faster rocky version charting at No. 63 in the UK. American metal band Metallica in 1998 played a version very similar to that of Thin Lizzy's, though with a heavier sound, winning a Grammy for the song in 2000 for Best Hard Rock Performance. In 2019, Canadian singer-songwriter Bryan Adams performed a cover of the song on his album Shine a Light.

Story
"Whiskey in the Jar" is the tale of a highwayman or footpad who, after robbing a military or government official, is betrayed by a woman; whether she is his wife or sweetheart is not made clear. Various versions of the song take place in Kerry, Kilmoganny, Cork, Sligo Town, and other locations throughout Ireland. It is also sometimes placed in the American South, in various places among the Ozarks or Appalachians, possibly due to Irish settlement in these places. Names in the song change, and the official can be a Captain or a Colonel, called Farrell or Pepper among other names. The protagonist's wife or lover is sometimes called Molly, Jenny, Emzy, or Ginny among various other names. The details of the betrayal are also different, being either betraying him to the person he robbed and replacing his ammunition with sand or water, or not, resulting in his killing the person.

History
The song's exact origins are unknown. A number of its lines and the general plot resemble those of a contemporary broadside ballad "Patrick Fleming" (also called "Patrick Flemmen he was a Valiant Soldier") about Irish highwayman Patrick Fleming, who was executed in 1650.

In the book The Folk Songs of North America, folk music historian Alan Lomax suggests that the song originated in the 17th century, and (based on plot similarities) that John Gay's 1728 The Beggar's Opera was inspired by Gay hearing an Irish ballad-monger singing "Whiskey in the Jar". In regard to the history of the song, Lomax states, "The folk of seventeenth century Britain liked and admired their local highwaymen; and in Ireland (or Scotland) where the gentlemen of the roads robbed English landlords, they were regarded as national patriots. Such feelings inspired this rollicking ballad."

At some point, the song came to the United States and was a favourite in Colonial America because of its irreverent attitude toward British officials. The American versions are sometimes set in America and deal with American characters. One such version, from Massachusetts, is about Alan McCollister, an Irish-American soldier who is sentenced to death by hanging for robbing British officials.

The song appeared in a form close to its modern version in a precursor called "The Sporting Hero, or, Whiskey in the Bar" in a mid-1850s broadsheet.

The song collector Colm Ó Lochlainn, in his book Irish Street Ballads, described how his mother learnt "Whiskey in the Jar" in Limerick in 1870 from a man called Buckley who came from Cork. When Ó Lochlainn included the song in Irish Street Ballads, he wrote down the lyrics from memory as he had learnt them from his mother. He called the song "There's Whiskey in the Jar", and the lyrics are virtually identical to the version that was used by Irish bands in the 1960s such as the Dubliners. The Ó Lochlainn version refers to the "far fam'd Kerry mountain" rather than the Cork and Kerry mountains, as appears in some versions.

The song also appears under the title "There's Whiskey in the Jar" in the Joyce collection, but that only includes the melody line without any lyrics. Versions of the song were collected in the 1920s in Northern Ireland by song collector Sam Henry. It is Roud Folk Song Index no. 533.

Variations

"Whiskey in the Jar" is sung with many variants on locations and names, including a version by Jerry Garcia of the Grateful Dead with mandolinist David Grisman; a version by The Dubliners (which is often sung in Irish traditional music sessions around the world); a rock version sung by Thin Lizzy; and a heavy metal version (inspired by Thin Lizzy's performance of the song) by Metallica.

There is also a song about Irish troops in the American Civil War called "We'll Fight for Uncle Sam", which is sung in the same tune of "Whiskey in the Jar".

Field recordings
 Lena Bourne Fish of East Jaffrey, New Hampshire, United States, 1940, recorded by Frank and Anne Warner
 Séamus Ennis  of Dublin, Ireland, World Library of Folk and Primitive Music, Vol. 2: Ireland 1951, recorded by Alan Lomax
 Mary Byrnes of Springside near Orange, New South Wales, Australia, 1954/1955, recorded by John Meredith
 Sarah Organ Gunning of Knox County, Kentucky, United States, 1974, recorded by Mark Wilson

Recordings
Partial discography:
 Burl Ives – Songs of Ireland 1958, as "Kilgary Mountain"
 The Highwaymen – Encore 1962
 The Brothers Four – In Person 1962, as "Darlin' Sportin' Jenny"
 The Limeliters – Sing Out! 1962, as "Kilgary Mountain"
 Robert De Cormier – Dance Gal – Gimme the Banjo 1964, as "Kilgary Mountain"
 The Seekers – The Seekers 1964
 Peter, Paul and Mary – A Song Will Rise 1965, as "Gilgarra Mountain"
 Joe Dassin – Mâche ta chique 1965
 The Dubliners – 1967 (album), 1968 (Single), 1969 (album)
 Thin Lizzy – November 1972 (Single), August 1976 (album)
 Euskefeurat – Mutta Herra Jumala 1982
 The Pogues – 1990, with The Dubliners
 Jerry Garcia, David Grisman – Shady Grove 1996
 Metallica – Garage Inc. 1998
 Smokie – Uncovered 2000
 The Poxy Boggards – Lager than Life 2002
 LeperKhanz – Tiocfaidh Ár Lá (2005)
 Johnny Logan – The Irish Connection 2007
 The High Kings – Memory Lane 2010
 Blaggards – Live in Texas 2010
 Celtic Thunder – Heritage 2011
 Nolwenn Leroy – Bretonne 2011 (only the deluxe edition)
 The Killdares – Live at the Granada Theater 2011
 Stompin' Tom Connors – Stompin' Tom and the Road's of Life 2012
 Santiano – Bis ans Ende der Welt 2012
 Daniel Kobialka – as "Gift of Dreams", a New Age version
 Down by Law - "Revolution Time" 10" EP, 2014
 El Cuarteto de Nos – Habla tu espejo 2014, as "Whisky en Uruguay"
 Gaelic Storm – Full Irish: The Best of Gaelic Storm 2004–2014 2014
 Bryan Adams – Shine a Light 2019

The song has also been recorded by singers and folk groups such as Roger Whittaker, The Irish Rovers, Seven Nations, Off Kilter, King Creosote, Brobdingnagian Bards, Charlie Zahm, and Christy Moore.

Liam Clancy recorded the song with his son and nephew on Clancy, O'Connell & Clancy in 1997, and Tommy Makem recorded it on The Song Tradition in 1998. The High Kings, featuring Bobby Clancy's son Finbarr, released a version in February 2011.

Thin Lizzy's 1972 single (bonus track on Vagabonds of the Western World [1991 edition]) stayed at the top of the Irish charts for 17 weeks, and the British release stayed in the top 30 for 12 weeks, peaking at No. 6, in 1973. This version has since been covered by U2, Pulp (first released on a 1996 various artist compilation album Childline and later on deluxe edition of Different Class in 2006), Smokie, Metallica (Garage Inc. 1998, which won a Grammy), Belle and Sebastian (The Blues Are Still Blue EP 2006), Gary Moore (2006), Nicky Moore (Top Musicians Play Thin Lizzy 2008), Simple Minds (Searching for the Lost Boys 2009), and Israeli musician Izhar Ashdot. The song is also on the Grateful Dead live compilation So Many Roads disc five.

On the bluegrass scene, Jerry Garcia and David Grisman recorded a  version for the album Shady Grove. It has also been performed by the Scarecrows bluegrass band and the Dutch band Blue Grass Boogiemen.

Icelandic folk band Þrjú á palli (Three On The Podium) recorded it in 1971 as "Lífið Er Lotterí (Life Is A Lottery)" with lyrics by Jónas Árnason. Lillebjørn Nilsen adapted it to Norwegian, as "Svikefulle Mari (Fraudulent Mari)", on his 1971 album Tilbake (Back). Finnish band Eläkeläiset (The Retired) recorded a humppa version as the title track of their 1997 album Humppamaratooni (Jump Marathon). In 2007 the Lars Lilholt Band made a Danish version, "Gi (Give)' Mig Whiskey in the Jar", for the album Smukkere Med Tiden (More Beautiful With Time). Estonian band Poisikõsõ recorded "Hans'a Õuhkaga" on the album Tii Päält Iist in 2007.

In 1966, the Yarkon Bridge Trio, an Israeli singing group, recorded a song named "Siman Sheata Tsair" ("It Is a Sign That You Are Young") set to the melody of "Whiskey in the Jar"; the song became a hit and was later covered by various artists, notably by Gidi Gov.

Charts

Thin Lizzy version

Weekly charts

Year-end charts

The Dubliners and Pogues version

Metallica version

Weekly charts

Year-end charts

Certifications

The Dubliners and Pogues version

Metallica version

References

External links
 Whiskey in the Jar Lyrics and chords on Irish Music Daily

1972 singles
1973 singles
1999 singles
Decca Records singles
The Brothers Four songs
The Dubliners songs
Grammy Award for Best Hard Rock Performance
The Highwaymen (folk band) songs
Irish folk songs
Irish rock songs
Irish Singles Chart number-one singles
Metallica songs
Music videos directed by Jonas Åkerlund
Peter, Paul and Mary songs
Songs about alcohol
Songs about criminals
Songwriter unknown
Thin Lizzy songs
Vertigo Records singles
Year of song unknown